Kevin Asselin (born February 9, 1985 in Acton Vale, Quebec) is a professional ice hockey player.

Asselin was drafted by the Cape Breton Screaming Eagles in Round 2 (22nd overall) of the 2001 Quebec Major Junior Hockey League draft. He demonstrated plenty of offensive potential during his junior hockey career, scoring 121 goals between 2001 and 2006, all spent as a member of the Screaming Eagles. In his final junior season, Asselin scored 44 goals and added 44 assists for a total of 88 points in 67 games. Asselin was never drafted by a National Hockey League team.

He split the 2006–07 season between the Texas Wildcatters, Bakersfield Condors, and Columbia Inferno of the ECHL.

Asselin was a member of the Saint-Hyacinthe Chiefs of the Ligue Nord-Américaine de Hockey (LNAH) for two seasons, scoring a league leading 48 goals in 2007–08. He was named the LNAH's top offensive rookie, as well as the league's most valuable player in recognition of his season.  He was claimed by the Thetford Mines Isothermic in a dispersal draft in 2009 after the Chiefs ceased operations.

In February, 2012, the Cape Breton Post named Asselin to the all-time All-Star Team of his former junior club, the Cape Breton Screaming Eagles, saying "the numbers don’t show the heart Asselin played with on the ice".

Career statistics

References

External links

1985 births
Cape Breton Screaming Eagles players
Canadian ice hockey right wingers
Ice hockey people from Quebec
Living people
People from Montérégie